Holdrege High School is a public high school located in Phelps County, Nebraska. It serves 9 to 12 grade students and was founded in 1960.

Notable alumni
 Todd Brown, former football player
 Tom Carlson, former Nebraska state senator
 Ed Schrock, former Nebraska state senator
 Scott Strasburger, former football player

References

External links
 
 Holdrege High School alumni website
 The Duster student newspaper

Public high schools in Nebraska
Education in Phelps County, Nebraska